Children's programming has played a part in NBC's programming since its initial roots in television. This article outlines the history of children's television programming on NBC including the various blocks and notable programs that have aired throughout the television network's history.

History

1947–1956
In 1947, NBC's first major children's program was Howdy Doody, one of the era's first breakthrough television programs. The series, which ran for 13 years until it ended in 1960, featured a myriad of characters led by a frecklefaced marionette voiced by the show's host, "Buffalo" Bob Smith. Howdy Doody spent the first nine years of its run airing on weekday afternoons.

1956–1992
In 1956, NBC stopped airing children's programming within its weekday afternoon schedule, relegating the network's children's shows to Saturdays only with Howdy Doody serving as its marquee franchise for the remaining four years of that series' run. From the mid-1960s until 1992, the bulk of the children's programs broadcast by NBC were derived from theatrical shorts like The Pink Panther Show and classic Woody Woodpecker and Looney Tunes shorts; reruns of popular television series such as The Flintstones and The Jetsons; and foreign acquisitions such as Astro Boy and Kimba the White Lion.

During this period, the network also aired original animated series – most notably, the 1980s series The Smurfs and Alvin and the Chipmunks. It also carried animated series adapted from certain live-action NBC series such as It's Punky Brewster (based on the sitcom Punky Brewster), Emergency +4 (based on the medical drama Emergency!) ALF: The Animated Series (based on the sitcom ALF) and Star Trek: The Animated Series (based on the science fiction drama Star Trek), as well as animated series vehicles for certain NBC prime time stars including Gary Coleman (The Gary Coleman Show) and Mr. T (Mister T), and original live-action series including the Sid & Marty Krofft-produced The Banana Splits, The Bugaloos and H.R. Pufnstuf.

The Metric Marvels, a short-form series produced by the creators of rival ABC's Schoolhouse Rock! as part of a failed attempt to encourage metrication in the United States, aired on NBC during the late 1970s.

In September 1985, NBC was the first network to broadcast Saturday morning cartoons in stereo.

One series that made up to the NBC Saturday morning lineup was Fraggle Rock: The Animated Series. NBC aired the program on Saturday mornings at 10:00 AM (later moved to 11:00 AM) for one season during 1987.

Final years with animated programming (1989–1992)
In September 1989, NBC premiered Saved by the Bell, a sitcom centered on the fictional Bayside High School in Pacific Palisades, California, which originated on The Disney Channel the year prior as Good Morning, Miss Bliss (the predecessor series, set in an Indianapolis, Indiana middle school, served as a starring vehicle for Hayley Mills, who did not return for the retooled series; four cast members from that show – Mark-Paul Gosselaar, Dennis Haskins, Lark Voorhies and Dustin Diamond – were cast in Saved by the Bell as their Miss Bliss characters). Despite receiving harsh reviews from television critics, Saved by the Bell would become one of the most popular teen-oriented series in television history as well as the highest-rated series on Saturday mornings, dethroning ABC's The Bugs Bunny and Tweety Show in its first season.

TNBC (1992–2002)

As a result of the continued success of Saved by the Bell, NBC restructured its Saturday morning lineup in September 1992, removing the animated series (ending the entirety of conventional children's programming – animated or otherwise – airing on NBC itself for the next eleven years) in favor of additional live-action – mostly scripted – series aimed at teenagers as part of a new three-hour block under the brand TNBC (the network also launched an hour-long Saturday edition of Today that debuted simultaneously with the TNBC lineup).

Most of the programs on the TNBC lineup were sitcoms produced by Saved by the Bell executive producer Peter Engel such as City Guys, Hang Time, California Dreams, One World and the Saved by the Bell spinoff, Saved by the Bell: The New Class. From the start, the lineup was designed to meet the earliest form of the Federal Communications Commission's educational programming guidelines under the Children's Television Act, with many of the scripted series incorporating social issues such as underage drinking, drug use and sexual harassment. By 2001, the block had begun suffering from declining viewership; in addition, although the block was aimed at adolescents, TNBC's programs ironically registered a median viewer age of 41.

NBA Inside Stuff, an analysis and interview program aimed at teens that was hosted for most of its run by Ahmad Rashad (who also served as a commentator and pre-game host for the network's NBA coverage during much of Inside Stuffs NBC run), also aired alongside the TNBC lineup during the NBA season until 2002, with the program moving to ABC the following season as a result of that network taking the NBA rights from NBC.

Discovery Kids on NBC (2002–2006)

On January 6, 2002, NBC entered into an agreement with Discovery Communications, in which it would produce a new Saturday morning block for the network featuring original programs from the Discovery Kids cable channel under a time-lease agreement to provide programming compliant with the FCC's educational programming guidelines to NBC's affiliates, rather than having any network input or production. The block, branded "Discovery Kids on NBC", premiered on October 5, 2002. Originally, the lineup consisted of only live-action series featuring a mix of new series and existing Discovery Kids programs including Trading Spaces: Boys vs. Girls (a spin-off of the TLC home renovation reality show Trading Spaces) and the reality game show Endurance (a Survivor-style series created and executive produced by host J. D. Roth, who later produced The Biggest Loser for NBC in 2003).

In November 2003, the block expanded to include animated series under the banner "Real Toons", marking the first time that any animated programming had aired on NBC since 1992. In March 2006, Discovery Communications announced it would not renew its contract with NBC, citing a desire to focus exclusively on the Discovery Kids cable channel. Discovery Kids on NBC ended its run on September 2, 2006.

Qubo on NBC (2006–2012)

In May 2006, NBCUniversal and Ion Media Networks announced plans to form Qubo, a joint venture in conjunction with Scholastic Corporation, Classic Media and Corus Entertainment subsidiary Nelvana. The multi-platform programming endeavor, aimed at children between 4 and 8 years of age, would comprise children's program blocks airing on NBC, Spanish-language sister network Telemundo and Ion Media's i: Independent Television (now Ion Television), as well as a 24-hour digital multicast channel on i's owned-and-operated stations (alternatively known as Qubo Channel), video on demand services and a branded website. The reasoning why the name "qubo" was chosen for the endeavor, or why its logo is a cube, has never been publicly explained by any of the partners, although general manager Rick Rodriguez stated in an interview with Multichannel News that the name was intended to be something that sounded fun, and be a brand that could easily be uniformally used in English and Spanish.

The new "Qubo on NBC" block premiered on September 9, 2006, featuring seven programs in its initial season: VeggieTales, 3-2-1 Penguins!, Dragon, Babar, Jane and the Dragon, Jacob Two-Two and Postman Pat. Initially, VeggieTales episodes aired on the block excised religious content originally incorporated before and after the main feature in the home video releases. This drew criticism for the block and NBC in particular from the conservative watchdog group Parents Television Council, as well as VeggieTales co-creator Phil Vischer, who claimed that he was unaware of the intent to edit out the religious material when Qubo acquired the program distribution rights.

NBC Kids (2012–2016; 2012–2017 on Telemundo)

On March 28, 2012, NBC announced that the three-hour children's programming time period allocated by the network on Saturday mornings would be taken over by Sprout (which had become a sister television property to NBC following parent company NBCUniversal's 2010 majority purchase by Comcast; NBC later took full ownership of the network, whose owners previously included Sesame Workshop and HIT Entertainment) and launch a new Saturday morning block called NBC Kids, which is aimed at preschoolers and grade school-aged children ages 2 to 9. Sprout also produced a Spanish-language sister block for Telemundo known as MiTelemundo.

NBC Kids debuted on July 7, 2012, one week after the Qubo block ended its run on both NBC and Telemundo on June 30 (which left Ion Television (and later Ion Plus) as the only network to retain a Qubo-branded children's block up until the closure of the Qubo Channel on February 28, 2021, as the E.W. Scripps Company is now the owner of Ion Media, which they acquired on January 7, 2021).

On February 24, 2016 and March 1, 2016, NBC and Telemundo announced that NBC Kids would shut down and succeeded on October 8, 2016 and January 6, 2018 by The More You Know, a block produced by Litton Entertainment that would feature live-action documentary and lifestyle programs aimed at pre-teens and teenagers, similarly to a block also introduced by Litton for NBC co-owner CW the previous 2 years. The move came as part of a shift by broadcast television networks towards using their Saturday morning lineup solely to comply with the educational programming requirements and when Sprout changed its name to Universal Kids on September 9, 2017. NBC Kids quietly went to the Noodle and Doodle end credits shortly before NBC Sports on September 25, 2016 on NBC and December 31, 2017 on Telemundo, with no on-air notice.

The More You Know (2016–present; 2018–present on Telemundo) 

On February 24, 2016 and March 1, 2016, NBC and Telemundo announced that it would lease its Saturday morning lineup to Litton Entertainment, The More You Know beginning October 2016 on NBC and January 2018 on Telemundo. Named after NBC's series of public service campaigns, the three-hour Saturday morning block is programmed by Litton Entertainment, and features live-action programming aimed at teens.

Programming

Scheduling issues
Not all shows within NBC's Saturday morning block are seen on all of the network's owned-and-operated stations and affiliates. Occasionally, some or all programs featured within the block are subject to delay or pre-emption due to local or syndicated programs scheduled by local NBC stations, or may be delayed by the network due to sporting events such as the Summer Olympic Games, the French Open, the USGA-sanctioned U.S. Open and Presidents Cup tournaments, or English Premier League soccer.

Due to regulations defined by the Children's Television Act that require stations to carry E/I compliant programming for three hours each week at any time between 7:00 a.m. and 10:00 p.m. local time, some NBC stations may defer certain programs aired within its Saturday morning block to Sunday daytime or earlier Saturday morning slots, or (in the case of affiliates in the Western United States) Saturday afternoons as makegoods to comply with the CTA regulations.

List of notable programs

Note: Shows listed in bold are in-house productions from NBC, most of which now have their distribution rights held by NBCUniversal Syndication Studios.
3-2-1 Penguins! (2006-2009, 2010)
Adventure Camp (2003)
The Adventures of Super Mario Bros. 3 (1990–1991)
Adventures of the Gummi Bears (1985–1989)
ALF: The Animated Series (1987–1989)
All About Us (2001)
Alvin and the Chipmunks (1983–1991)
Astroblast! (2014–2016)
Astro Boy (1963–1978)
Babar (2006-2007, 2008-2012)
 Batman and the Super 7 (1980-1981)
The Banana Splits Adventure Hour (1968–1970)
Big John, Little John (1976–1977)
Birdman and The Galaxy Trio (1967-1968)
The Bugaloos (1970–1972)
Brains and Brawn (1993)
Butch Cassidy and the Sundance Kids (1973–74)
California Dreams (1992–1996)
Camp Candy (1989–1990)
Captain N: The Game Master (1989–1992)
The Champion Within with Lauren Thompson (2016–2020)
The Chica Show (2013–2016)
Chip and Pepper's Cartoon Madness (1991–1992)
City Guys (1997–2001)
Clangers (2015–2016)
Consumer 101 (2018–2021)
Croc Files (2002–2005)
Darcy's Wild Life (2004–2006)
Down and Out with Donald Duck (1987)
Double Up (1992)
Earth to Luna! (2015–2016)
Earth Odyssey with Dylan Dreyer (2019–present)
Endurance (2002–2003, 2003–2004, 2004–2006)
Fraggle Rock: The Animated Series (1987–1988)
Flight 29 Down (2005–2006)
 The Flintstones (1966-1970, 1981)
 The Flintstone Comedy Show (1980-1982)
 The Flintstone Funnies (1982-1984; reruns of The Flintstone Comedy Show)
Floogals (2016)
The Gary Coleman Show (1982–1983)
Give (2016–2018)
The Godzilla/Dynomutt Hour with the Funky Phantom (1980)
Godzilla (1978–1981)
Gravedale High (1990)
Hang Time (1995–2000)
Health + Happiness with Mayo Clinic (2018)
 Hong Kong Phooey (1978, 1980-1981)
Hoppity Hooper (1963–1966)
H.R. Pufnstuf (1969–1970)
I'm Telling! (1987–1988)
The Incredible Hulk (1982–1983)
It's Punky Brewster (1985–1987, 1988-1989)
Jacob Two-Two (2006-2007, 2009)
Jane and the Dragon (2006-2008, 2009-2010, 2012)
Jeff Corwin Unleashed (2003–2005)
The Jetsons (1966-1967, 1971-1975, 1976, 1979, 1980, 1981, 1982)
Journey with Dylan Dreyer (2016–2018)
Just Deal (2000–2002)
Justin Time (2012–2014)
The Karate Kid (1989–1990)
Kenny the Shark (2003–2005, 2006)
The Kid Super Power Hour with Shazam! (1981–1982)
Kid 'n Play (1990–1991)
Kidd Video (1984–1987)
Kimba the White Lion (1965–1980)
Kissyfur (1986–1990)
Land of the Lost (1974–1976, 1978)
LarryBoy Adventures (2006-2007)
LazyTown (2012-2016)
Little Robots (2011-2012)
The Magic School Bus (2010-2011)
Make Way for Noddy (2013–2014)
Mister T (1983–1986)
Name Your Adventure (1992–1995)
Naturally, Danny Seo (2016–2019)
NBA Inside Stuff (1990–2002)
The New Adventures of Flash Gordon (1979–1980, 1982–1983)
The New Archie and Sabrina Hour (1977)
A New Leaf (2019–2020)
Nina's World (2016)
Noodle and Doodle (2012–2016)
One Team: The Power of Sports (2021–present)
One World (1998–2001)
Operation Junkyard (2002–2003)
 The New Fred and Barney Show (1979-1980)
Pajanimals (2012–2014)
Pearlie (2010-2012)
The Pink Panther Show (1969–1978)
Prehistoric Planet (2002–2003)
Poppy Cat (2012–2013, 2014–2015)
ProStars (1991)
Return to the Planet of the Apes (1975–1976)
The Rocky and Bullwinkle Show (1961–1964, 1981–1982)
The Roman Holidays (1972)
Roots Less Traveled (2020–present)
The Ruff and Reddy Show (1957–1958)
Ruff-Ruff, Tweet and Dave (2015–2016)
Running the Halls (1993)
Saved by the Bell (1989–1993; produced by NBC Productions)
Saved by the Bell: The New Class (1993–2000)
Scout's Safari (2002–2004)
Sealab 2020 (1972–73)
Shelldon (2009-2012)
Shirley Temple's Storybook (1958-1961)
Shirt Tales (1982-1984)
Sigmund and the Sea Monsters (1973–1975)
Sk8 (2001–2002)
Skunked TV (2004)
The Smurfs (1981–1989)
The Snorks (1984–1986)
Space Cats (1991–1992)
Space Kidettes (1966–1967)
Space Sentinels (1977–1978)
 Speed Buggy (1977)
Spider-Man and His Amazing Friends (1981–1986)
Star Trek: The Animated Series (1973–1975)
Strange Days at Blake Holsey High (2002–2005)
Super Mario World (1991–1992)
Terrific Trucks (2015–2016)
Time Warp Trio (2005–2006)
Trading Spaces: Boys vs. Girls (2003–2006)
Turbo Dogs (2008-2009, 2010-2011)
Tutenstein (2003–2006)
 Top Cat (1966, 1967, 1968-1969)
The Gumby Show (1956–1959)
 Underdog (1964-1966, 1968-1970, 1972-1973)
VeggieTales (2006-2009)
VeggieTales Presents: 3-2-1 Penguins! and LarryBoy Adventures Stories (2006-2009)
Vets Saving Pets (2018–present)
The Voyager with Josh Garcia (2016–present)
Walking with Dinosaurs (2002–2003)
Walking with Prehistoric Beasts (2002–2003)
Wilderness Vet with Dr. Oakley (2016–2018)
The Wiggles (2012–2013)
Wild Child (2021–present)
Willa's Wild Life (2009-2012)
Wish Kid (1991-1992)
Yo Yogi! (1991–1992)
The Zula Patrol (2008-2009, 2012)
Zou (2014)

Saturday morning preview specials

1973 – Starship Rescue (hosted by Kevin Tighe and Randolph Mantooth from Emergency!)
1974 – Preview Revue (hosted by Jimmy Osmond; featuring Johnny Whitaker)
1975 – Preview Revue (hosted by The Lockers; featuring Michael Landon, and Billy Barty and Johnny Whitaker from Sigmund and the Sea Monsters)
1976 – Smilin' Saturday Morning Parade (hosted by Freddie Prinze)
1977 – C'Mon Saturday (hosted by Andrea McArdle from Annie; featuring Arte Johnson, Leonard Nimoy, Muhammad Ali and Ruth Buzzi)
1978 – Saturday Superstars (hosted by Bay City Rollers; featuring Erik Estrada, Joe Namath and Scott Baio)
1983 – Yummy Awards (hosted by Ricky Schroder; special appearance by a live-action Spider-Man to promote his animated show)
1984 – Laugh Busters (featuring Spider-Man and His Amazing Friends, Kidd Video, Alvin and the Chipmunks, The Snorks, Pink Panther and Sons, Mr. T and The Smurfs)
1985 – Back to Next Saturday (hosted by Keshia Knight Pulliam and Lisa Whelchel)
1986 – Alvin Goes Back to School
1987 – ALF Loves a Mystery (hosted by Benji Gregory from ALF)
1989 – Who Shrunk Saturday Morning? (hosted by the cast of Saved by the Bell; featuring ALF, John Candy and Marsha Warfield)

See also
 Lists of United States network television schedules – includes articles on Saturday morning children's programming schedules among the major networks
 Children's programming on the American Broadcasting Company
 Children's programming on CBS

References

 
TNBC

NBC